Phantom Breaker is a fighting video game developed and published by 5pb. for the Xbox 360 in June 2011.
An arcade version of the game running on Sega's RingEdge 2 arcade board, titled Phantom Breaker: Another Code, was released in April 2013.
In addition, an enhanced edition, titled, Phantom Breaker: Extra, was released for the PlayStation 3 and Xbox 360 in September 2013. A beat 'em up spin-off, Phantom Breaker: Battle Grounds, was released via Xbox Live Arcade.

The latest update, Phantom Breaker: Omnia, was released worldwide in March 2022 for PlayStation 4, Xbox One, Nintendo Switch and PC via Steam by Rocket Panda Games.

Gameplay 
Phantom Breaker is a 2D fighting game that supports two distinctive fighting styles, the player is able to choose between "Quick" style and "Hard" style. Quick style focuses on quick hits and combos while the other is more about defense.

When the player reaches "Overdrive" mode, their character might get an extra increase in speed or defense. Every attack the player releases can cancel out their enemy's attack and raise their tension gauge; timing it right will maximise the player's gauge to boost their attack power.

Plot 

The game's setting takes place in Japan. A mystery organization led by Phantom organised a fighting tournament in Tokyo, whose winner will have their wish granted.

Characters 
Before the release of Phantom Breaker: Omnia, the game had a total of 18 playable characters. An additional "female gang member" character was planned, but never made it into the final game.

: A 19-year-old college violinist. Her weapon is a large, two-handed sword named Maestro.
: A 14-year-old idol. Her weapon is a magical wand called Candy.
: A high school girl, who is also a ninja-in-training from the Bakufu era. Her weapons are Shoukaku and Zuikaku — a ninja blade and a kunai.
: A descendant of the miko (a family of exorcists that have had some dealings with Phantom in the past). She fights with Kahoutou, her naginata, to stop the duels.
: One of the few males in this contest. He is fighting to cure his little sister of an incurable disease. He fights with a gauntlet named Koutarou.
: She has no memories and fights only to satisfy her lust for battles. Her weapon of choice is a mace made of scrap materials, named Humongous.
: She does not know much of the world and has a gentle personality but a strong sense of justice. She beats opponents over the head with her battle hammer, Maggie.
: She finds out that one of the other combatants in Phantom Breaker killed her mother, and she is on a quest for revenge. She fights with two blades called Aldina.
: The other male main character in this game. He is the CEO of a pharmaceutical company and he is fighting in order to resurrect his parents, who were assassinated fifteen years ago. He uses a long sword named Setsuna.
: She got bored with the real world and modified her body into an idealized version, based on a video game she liked. Her occupation is cosplaying. She fights with a giant claw called Kusenia's Claw.
: A 9-year-old time traveler from the future who is part of the organization "Schrodinger". She is accompanied by a droid named Mauchuu. Her weapons are all-purpose laser guns named JJ Apple.
: He is not one of the main characters but the bodyguard to the mysterious Phantom. He fights using telekinesis.
: A new character added in Phantom Breaker: Extra. Sophia is a Fu-mantion Artifact made by the Russian Science Academy that despises Phantom.
: A new character added in Phantom Breaker: Extra. A former senior official that worked for Phantom who wants to bring Japan back to its militarism dogma.
: A new character added in Phantom Breaker: Extra. Ende is from the Schrödinger Space-Time patrol group and brings a giant robot named Nataku into battle.
: Two new characters added in Phantom Breaker: Extra. Gaito & Rin are a team, but Rin, a 6-year-old girl, controls Gaito, an anti-soul that is brimming with power.
: Guest character from Chaos;Head. She is a Gigalomaniac who can turn her delusions into reality. She wields a DI-sword.
: Guest character from Steins;Gate. She is a genius who graduated early from an American university and helps out in a circle that develops strange inventions. She uses these strange inventions in gameplay.

Release 
Phantom Breaker was initially slated to be launched in April 2011, but was delayed and released in June 2011. The game had been announced for a first quarter 2012 North American release by 7Sixty (a subsidiary of SouthPeak Games) but the release has since been cancelled for unknown reasons.

Phantom Breaker: Another Code 
An arcade version of the game running on the RingEdge 2 board titled  was released on April 4, 2013. Version 1.1 was released in June 2013. This version adds Infinity, the game's final boss, as a playable character, rebalanced gameplay, and a new opening movie.

Phantom Breaker: Extra 
In May 2013, 5pb. announced a new updated version of Phantom Breaker titled  which was released for the PlayStation 3 and Xbox 360 on September 19, 2013. It features rebalanced gameplay, new characters, new techniques, a new "Extra" fighting style, new stages, renewed background effects, and an online spectator mode. Unlike the first console release, it is region-free.

Phantom Breaker: Omnia 
In 2020, the company Rocket Panda Games announced that it will publish the updated version of the game called Phantom Breaker: Omnia for PlayStation 4, Xbox One, Nintendo Switch and PC. It features all the fighters from Phantom Breaker: Extra in addition to two new characters, a remixed soundtrack, a new fighting style called "Omnia", balance adjustments, and the ability to play though stories of both the original game and Phantom Breaker: Extra. This is first time the game will see a release outside of Japan and feature both Japanese and English voice acting. The game was released on March 15, 2022.

Reception 

Phantom Breaker received generally negative reviews from critics. Jason Venter of GameSpot gave the game a score of 4.5/10, saying, "Phantom Breaker fights a losing battle to provide you with a reason to play it instead of one of its many qualified peers."

Phantom Breaker: Omnia 

Phantom Breaker: Omnia received "mixed or average" reviews according to review aggregator Metacritic.

Notes

References

External links 
 
 
 

2011 video games
2D fighting games
ALL.Net games
Arcade video games
Japan-exclusive video games
Video games about ninja
Nintendo Switch games
PlayStation 3 games
PlayStation 4 games
Science fiction video games
Fighting games
Video games developed in Japan
Video games featuring female protagonists
Video games scored by Takeshi Abo
Video games set in Japan
Video games with 2.5D graphics
Xbox 360 games
Xbox One games
Windows games
Multiplayer and single-player video games